Latacunga Canton is one of seven cantons of the Cotopaxi Province in Ecuador. Its population at the 2001 census was 143,979.  Its capital is the town of Latacunga.

Subdivision 
The capital of the canton consists of the following urban parishes: Eloy Alfaro (San Felipe), Ignacio Flores (La Laguna), Juan Montalvo (San Sebastián), La Matríz, San Buenaventura. 

The canton is divided into the following rural parishes: 
 Toacaso
 San Juan de Pastocalle
 Mulaló
 Tanicuchí
 Guaytacama
 Alaques
 Poaló
 Once de Noviembre
 Belisario Quevedo
 Joseguango Bajo

Demographics 
Ethnic groups as of the Ecuadorian census of 2010:
Mestizo  86.4%
Indigenous  8.5%
White  2.7%
Afro-Ecuadorian  1.5%
Montubio  0.7%
Other  0.1%

References

External links 
 Map of Cotopaxi Province
 www.latacunga.gov.ec

Cantons of Cotopaxi Province